John McKager "Mac" Stipanovich (born November 26, 1948) is an American lobbyist, political strategist, and activist, best known for his role in the 2000 United States presidential election recount in Florida, in which he helped advise then-Secretary of State of Florida, Katherine Harris.

Early life and education 
Stipanovich was born in Ocala, Florida. He earned a Bachelor of Arts degree from the University of Florida in 1972, followed by a Juris Doctor from the Fredric G. Levin College of Law in 1974.

Career
Stipanovich previously served as chief of staff to Florida Governor Bob Martinez from 1987 to 1991. After that, he served on Jeb Bush's gubernatorial campaign against Lawton Chiles during the 1994 Florida gubernatorial election.

Stipanovich is portrayed in the HBO film Recount by Bruce McGill. The film, which had a broadcast premiere on May 25, 2008, chronicled the events in Florida during the presidential election lawsuits and appeals.

Stipanovich has written op-ed columns for The New York Times, Tampa Bay Times, Sun-Sentinel, and others. Since the 2016 United States presidential election, Stipanovich has been critical of President Donald Trump and the Republican Party, calling the latter "...isolationist, protectionist, nativist, and xenophobic." In 2019, Stipanovich registered as a Democrat, stating that he was supportive of 2020 candidates Joe Biden, Pete Buttigieg, and Amy Klobuchar. In a February 2020 op-ed for the Tampa Bay Times, Stipanovich stated that he would be "voting in the Democratic primary for the first time in 40 years." In March 2020, Stipanovich officially endorsed Joe Biden.

References

External links
Official Profile
St. Petersburg Times article about Stipanovich
Fowler White Lobbying information (archived)

1948 births
Florida Republicans
Fredric G. Levin College of Law alumni
Living people
Politicians from Ocala, Florida
University of Florida alumni